Bannockburn railway station served the town of Bannockburn, Stirlingshire, Scotland from 1848 to 1950 on the Scottish Central Railway.

History 
The station opened on 1 March 1848 by the Scottish Central Railway.  The goods yard was to the south, on the east side of the line. Further sidings were added later on as well as the platforms being lengthened. The station closed to both passengers and goods traffic on 2 January 1950.

References 

Former Caledonian Railway stations
Railway stations in Great Britain opened in 1848
Railway stations in Great Britain closed in 1950
1848 establishments in Scotland
1950 disestablishments in Scotland